Holy Rood High School is a Roman Catholic secondary school situated on the edge of Holyrood Park, near Arthur's Seat beside Duddingston Village, in Edinburgh. It is about half a mile a way from Castlebrae Community High School.

Headteacher and senior leadership team
The headteacher is Joan Daly. She is assisted by depute headteachers Chris Moore, Martin Connelly, Fiona Forbes and business manager Derek Ferguson.

History
The original Holy Rood RC High School was opened in 1971, when it replaced St Anthony's Secondary School.

The current school building was officially opened in September 2009 with the original 1970s build being demolished.

Admissions
The school has a current pupil roll of approximately 1050 pupils and 80 teaching staff.

Notes

References

External links
HMIE Inspection Reports

Catholic secondary schools in Edinburgh
1971 establishments in Scotland
Educational institutions established in 1971